The AN class are a class of diesel locomotives built by Clyde Engineering, Somerton for Australian National in 1992–1993.

Introduction to service and operating history

They entered service on Australian National's standard gauge network from Broken Hill to Adelaide, Alice Springs and Perth. In 1995, all were leased to National Rail with the transfer of Australian National's interstate operations.

In January 1996, AN10 was destroyed in the Hines Hill train collision. In November 1997, the remaining 10 were sold to National Rail. passing into Pacific National ownership with the sale of National Rail in February 2002. In 2004, they began to operate to Darwin on The Ghan following this line opening with AN3 painted in the Ghan livery between 2004 and 2014.

Future

As of January 2023, AN class locomotives are generally used as trailing locomotives on Intermodal and Steel services between Melbourne, Adelaide and Sydney. They were commonly used as second locomotives on steel trains in New South Wales, Victoria, South Australia and Western Australia. The class are currently facing storage in Melbourne due to combined high operational costs and mechanical failures. It's rumoured they'll be stored in Werris Creek, New South Wales. 

As of 17th February 2023, the entire class is stored, with all except AN1 (which is in Port Augusta) in storage at South Dynon.

Fleet status

References

Clyde Engineering locomotives
Co-Co locomotives
Pacific National diesel locomotives
Railway locomotives introduced in 1992
Standard gauge locomotives of Australia
Diesel-electric locomotives of Australia